Impact Wrestling is a professional wrestling company based in Nashville, Tennessee. Former employees (family name letters A–C) in Impact Wrestling consist of professional wrestlers, managers, play-by-play and color commentators, announcers, interviewers, referees, trainers, script writers, executives, and board of directors. In the case of wrestlers originating from Spanish-speaking countries, who most often have two surnames, the paternal (first) surname is used.

Impact Wrestling talent contracts range from developmental contracts to multi-year deals. They primarily appeared on Impact television programming, pay-per-views, monthly specials, and live events, and talent with developmental contracts appeared at Border City Wrestling and Ohio Valley Wrestling. When talent is released of their contract, it could be for a budget cut, the individual asking for their release, for personal reasons, time off from an injury, or retirement.

Those who made appearances without a contract and those who were previously released but are currently employed by Impact Wrestling are not included.

Alumni (A–C)

See also 
List of Impact Wrestling personnel

References 

Lists of professional wrestling personnel